The Young Pioneers/Jeunes Pionniers of Mali (1960–?) were Socialist youth brigades established by the Sudanese Union – African Democratic Rally of Modibo Keïta.

Pioneer movement
Youth organisations based in Mali